Coronado Heights is a hill northwest of Lindsborg, Kansas, United States.  It is alleged to be near the place where Francisco Vásquez de Coronado gave up his search for the seven cities of gold and turned around to return to Mexico.  Coronado Heights is one of a chain of seven sandstone bluffs in the Dakota Formation and rises approximately 300 feet.

History
In 1915, a professor at Bethany College in Lindsborg found chain mail from Spanish armor at the Sharps Creek site, a Native American village excavation site a few miles southwest of the hill, and another Bethany College professor promoted the name of Coronado Heights for the hill. 

In 1920, the first road was built up the hill, known as Swensson Drive, with a footpath known as Olsson Trail. 

In 1936, a stone shelter resembling a castle was built on top of the hill as a project of the Works Progress Administration. 

In 1988, a sculpture by John Whitfield was placed half-way up the hill with the inscription "Coronado Heights 'A Place to Share'".

The hill is now Coronado Heights Park, owned by the Smoky Valley Historical Association.  It is possible to see for miles from the summit, and wildflowers bloom on the hill in spring and summer. In summer, there are many prairie racerunners around the castle.

References

External links
 Coronado Heights Park
 Ground broken for Coronado Heights renovation work; $150K project - The Hutchinson News

Works Progress Administration in Kansas
Parks in Kansas
Protected areas of Saline County, Kansas
Colonial United States (Spanish)
Pre-statehood history of Kansas